Hinduism in Mongolia is a minority religion; it has few followers and only began to appear in Mongolia in the late twentieth century. According to the 2010 and 2011 Mongolian census, the majority of people that identify as religious follow Buddhism (86%), Shamanism (4.7), Islam (4.9%) or Christianity (3.5). Only 0.5% of the population follow other religions.

During the twentieth century, the socialist Mongolian People's republic restricted religious practices and enforced atheism across the country. The fall of the communist regime in the late '90s signalled the beginning of an era of religious pluralism and experimentation. Mongolians began practising Hinduism and other world religions and spiritualities including Mormonism and Christianity.

Spiritual congregations that teach Hindu philosophies including The International Society for Krishna Consciousness, The Art of Living foundation and the Ananda Marga organisation operate in Ulaanbataar. Practices that gain inspiration from Hinduism such as Patanjali Yoga and spiritual vegetarianism are practised in Mongolia; and according to Saskia Abraahms-Kavunenko, Mongolian Buddhists have begun to incorporate Hindu spirituality and concepts into their Buddhist customs. Hindu symbols have influenced Mongolian myth, legend, culture and tradition.

History

Hinduism in the Mongol Empire 
The Mongol Empire was religiously tolerant. Genghis Khan was open to religious diversity and the nations that Genghis Khan conquered continued to practice their own native religions. For this reason, Buddhism, Shamanism, Islam and Christianity were all reportedly practised under the Mongolian emperor.

Hindu Allusions In Mongolia History 
Mongolia is a Buddhist majority nation. According to author Sharad Soni, because of this Mongolia and India are spiritual neighbours. Many of the Hindu allusions, gods, deities and practices are present in Buddhist beliefs. Hinduism in Mongolia is prevalent and understood because Mongolian History and belief systems contain many Hindu allusions. For example,  the Grand Lama of Mongolia in the 1500s was said to be an incarnation of the Hindu and Buddhist god Maitreya; Mongolians worship the Mahakala as a manifestation of the Hindu god Shiva.

Hinduism In the Mongolian Peoples Republic 
Preceding the shift to communism Mongolia's political system and culture intersected with Buddhist systems and practices. The soviet-style Mongolians People Republic repressed religious freedom. The republic destroyed monasteries and religious symbols and enforced the public to adopt atheism. As stated by academic Evan Marie-Dominique, Following the era of spiritual oppression, the collapse of the communist regime in 1999 saw Mongolia return to its religious identity. Buddhism returned to being Mongolia's predominant religion. Since 1990, Mongolians have begun to experiment with other religious identities and collectives.

Hinduism In Mongolian Myth and Legend

The Hindu God Shiva 

According to Berthold Laufer, in Mongolian mythology, an inspirational dream featuring the Hindu God Shiva instigated the conversion of the Mongol emperors to Buddhism. The Myth that is narrated by Mongolian Chronicle Sanang Setsen states that the Mongolian Grand Kublai Khan summoned a monk to respond to his questions surrounding a book of Tantras. The monk did not know the answer to the Khans questions and could barely comprehend the emperors questioning. The Myth states that that night, the monk was visited in a dream by the Hindu god Shiva; In the Hindu belief system the god Shiva represents the god of inspiration and is said to be accountable for the Indian Sanskrit text the Pāṇini. Shiva produced a book of Tantras that the monk memorised during his sleep. The day after being visited by the Hindu god, the monk returned  and was able to respond to all of Kublai Khans questions, resulting in his appointment by the Khan as the Holy Lama and the King of Doctrine in China, Tibet and Mongolia. During this era, the monk Phagpa reshaped Mongolian courts and scriptures to more heavily reflect Tibetan Buddhism and lay the foundation of Mongolia's Buddhist future.

The Ganga Lake 
According to Mongolian writer Gombojav Mend-ooyo, Mongolian legend claims that the Ganga Lake in Mongolia's Sükhbaatar Province originated from two flasks of water brought by a Mongolian Nobleman from the River Ganges in India. The Ganges is an influential Hindu symbol that gives one the possibility to bathe in order to renounce their sins. The legends of the Ganga lake in Mongolia mirrors the Hindu belief of redemption from the Ganges, and according to the Mongolian folklore, the water from the Ganga lake has both healing and purifying qualities.

Hinduism in Modern Mongolia 
Hinduism is the third most practiced religion in the world and is growing by 1.9% per year. According to the Yearbook of International Religious Demography records of 2014 today, 98.3% of the worlds Hindu's live in South Asia. Hinduism is an umbrella term that refers to many diverse groups that direct their practice towards different gods, and different scriptures. In Mongolia, societies and practices that refer to certain aspects of Hinduism are growing.

The Mongolian religious revival 
The fall of the Mongolian People's Republic in 1990 ended an era of enforced atheism and the Mongolian people's national and cultural interest in religion was reignited. During its rule, The Soviet inspired government destroyed an estimated 700 Buddhist monasteries, as well as an unknown number of religious congregations and buildings.  There was also a decline of known religious custodians and practitioners. According to Saskia Abrahms-Kavunenko, the lack of formalised Buddhist institutions and practitioners resulted in religious insecurity and uncertainty in Mongolia, that when paired with the resurgence of religiosity enabled the growth of trans-local religious and spiritual groups in the capital. The International Society for Krishna consciousness, the Sri Sri Ravi Shankar collective and the Ananda Marga organisation are popular congregations that explore Hindu spirituality and philosophies in Ulaanbaatar. Some Mongolians fill gaps in their understandings of Buddhism with the alternative religious discourses, ideas and practices that they learn from these spiritual groups. In a study conducted by Abrahms-Kavunenko, one-third of the Mongolian Buddhists that she interviewed had attended at least one of Sri Sri's Hindu spiritual retreats. Patanjali Yoga and vegetarian diets, both important Hindu values have also become normalised characteristics of Mongolian Buddhism. Due to the philosophical similarities between Hindu and Buddhist concepts including, for example, reincarnation, Karma and meditation, Buddhist Mongols since 1990 have begun to incorporate Hindu spiritual ideas and practices into their Buddhist philosophies to fill the explanatory gaps in their understanding of Buddhism.

The Practices of Mongolian Hindus 
Hinduism is a minority religion in Mongolia; there are no formalised nationwide events or celebrations. Due to the influx of Hindu based philosophical societies and spiritual congregations in Ulaanbaatar, aspects of Hindu spirituality and practice are noticeable in the capital.

Vegetarianism in Mongolia 
Mongolian diets traditionally contain a lot of meat and livestock produce. The Hindu-based spiritual group's Ananda Marga and the Art of Living preach Vegetarian lifestyles because it helps attendees attain a higher spiritual state. The Ananda Marga collective opened the first Vegetarian restaurant in Ulaanbaatar in 2006, since then more than ten vegetarian restaurants that are associated with Hindu spiritual collectives have opened.

Hindu Literature in Mongolia 
Texts that explore Hindu spiritual philosophies are not uncommon in Mongolia. Based on an ethnographic study conducted in Ulaanbaatar, Abrahms-Kavunenko claims that in Mongolian bookstores texts written by the Hindu guru Osho and by Sri Sri Ravi Shankar are often found in the best sellers aisle.

Krishna society of Mongolia or International Society for Krishna Consciousness actively translated many books of its founding Guru Srila Prabhupada including Bhagavadgita As It Is into Mongolian. The books are sold online through facebook as well as on physical stores.
Catching up with Hare Krishnas, devotees of Art of Living Guru Sri Sri Ravi Shankar have translated many of their Guru's pamphlets and commentaries on classical Indian philosophical discourses such as Upanishads and Yoga Sutra.

First to translate books on transcendental meditation  into Mongolian were devotees of late guru Sri Chinmoy.

delving more into intricate concepts and nuances of Hindu philosophy, a book " Outline of Indian Philosophical Systems in Mongolian language" reviewing concepts of traditional 6 Hindu darshanas (Charvaka, Mimamsa, Nyaya, Vaisesika, Sankhya, Yoga) with emphasis in Advaita Vedanta by Adi Shankara appeared in book stores of Ulaanbaatar in July, 2021.

Meditation in Mongolia 
Hindu spiritual groups such as the Art of living organisation and the Hare Krishna propagate meditation through the Hindu-based philosophical framework that views meditation as an instrument to achieve a greater degree of self-awareness.

Patanjali Yoga In Mongolia 
Sri Sri Ravi Shankar's retreats incorporate and teach the ideas of Patanjali yoga. A yogic system that is based on Hindu sutras and thought and that explores the relationship between matter and spirit. One-third of Mongolian Lay Buddhists have attended at least one of Sri Sri Ravi Shankar's retreats and thus are familiar with the Patanjali philosophy. It is easy to find Yoga centres in Ulaanbaatar.

Religious tolerance in Mongolia 
By law, the Mongolian government ensures religious freedom and the separation of religious institutions and the state. Religious collectives in Mongolia must be registered by authorities. According to the United Nations Refugee Agency (UNHR), Smaller religious organisations and institutions in Mongolia have reported that they face discrimination when applying to register to the authorities as an official religious collective. Other minority groups claim that they face similar problems when trying to renew past registrations. Unregistered religious collectives and minority religious groups claim to be disproportionately harassed by government officials, tax collectors and police for no identifiable legal reason.

Hindu Congregations and Societies In Modern Mongolia

Hare Krishna in Mongolia 

The first congregation In Mongolia that practiced Hindu beliefs and that attempted to become a government registered society is a Krishna collective in Mongolia's Capital Ulaanbaatar. According to Graham M.Schewig, Krishna Consciousness is a branch of Hinduism that originates from the Hindu sect Vaishnavism and centres around the worship of the Hindu deity Vishnu, or Krishna. The Mongolian Krishna society is a branch of The International Society for Krishna Consciousness (ISKCON), or the Hare Krishna movement.

Hare Krishna was first brought to Mongolia in 1999 by Lakshmi Narayana; who was a devoted ISKCON senior who travelled as a missionary from East Siberia to Mongolia in order to run a series of public Hare Krishna programs. According to ISKCON, Many Mongolians showed an immediate interest in the practice; Local devotees began hosting their own weekly worship sessions, and upon the translation of Srila Prabhupada's spiritual texts into Mongolian the congregation reached a wider audience.] As of 2009, the Hare Krishna spiritual practice has 25 devotees with more undergoing training in India, as well as many students that practice Krishna Consciousness. The congregation plan to expand and become a government registered society.

Hare Krishna Temples 
In 2009 the society attempted to become a registered society under the Mongolian government, the government accepted the request upon the condition that the congregation build an official temple. In 2009 ISKON announced the plan to construct a Vedic temple in Ulaanbaatar. Before the proposed construction of the temple, the society held weekly sessions in a local yurt. In 2009 ISKON stated that the funding of the temple would be a challenge as it relied on donations, there have been no updates on the progression of the temple since this announcement.

The Art Of Living 
The Art of Living foundation is a spiritual, educational and humanitarian movement that was founded by Sri Sri Ravi Shankar in 1981. The organisation operates in 152 countries and propagates Sri Sri Ravi Shankar's philosophy of peace and compassion. Ravi Shankar teaches the essence of spirituality and promotes Hindu values, practices, systems and traditions. The Art of living is not a religious organisation;  It a spiritual one that borrows Hindu practices such as yoga, puja and chanting and Hindu values such as gratitude, love, belongingness and compassion. An Art Of Living (AOL) class was first held in Ulaanbaatar in 1995.  The Meditation centre in Mongolia is currently training over one hundred teachers how to conduct courses conceptualised by Sri Sri Ravi Shankar, and over one million Mongols have attended at least one Art Of living course or retreat. A Mongolian interviewee of writer Narayani Ganesh who attends the Art Of Living courses affirmed that he did not give up Buddhism to adopt Sri Sri Ravi Shankar's philosophies; that instead, the two systems complement each other.  According to Saskia Abrahms-Kavunenko, one in three Lay Buddhists have attended at least one of Art Of Living retreats. Sri Sri Ravi Shankar has visited Mongolia three times, each time he has been greeted with an audience of between Three thousand and Five thousand people. An international Art Of Living Ashram is being built on a site near Ulaanbataar. According to Narayani Ganesh, the Art of Living spiritual organisation has been successful in former soviet countries such as Russia, Poland and Mongolia that lack spiritual guidance due to the years of religious repression.

Ananda Marga 
Ananda Marga is a socio-spiritual organisation that was founded by Prabhat Ranjan Sarkar in India in 1955. Ananda Marga is a Hindu-based philosophical and yogic system. It does not worship a deity but has selected certain teachings of Hindu origin to form its philosophy. Ananda Marga is recognised as a religious denomination of Hinduism and propagates personal-development and the improvement of society.

Didi Ananda Kalika, formerly known as Gabrielle Dowling, is an Ananda Marga nun that moved to Ulaanbaatar in 1993 where she opened an orphanage and began practising Ananda Marga spirituality. The lotus children's school is an orphanage in Ulaanbaatar that promotes Ananda Magara spirituality. Didi Ananda Kalika also runs the Ananda Yoga Centre, Mongolia where they teach yoga, meditative practices and Ananda Marga ideologies. Didi Ananda Kalika opened the first Vegetarian restaurant in Ulaanbaatar named the Ananda Cafe in 2006 following the Ananda Marga philosophical values and spiritual movement that promotes vegetarianism.

References

Mongolia
Religion in Mongolia
Mongolia